Supergott is the second and final studio album by Swedish music group Caramell released on 16 November 2001, by Remixed Records. It is famous for the opening song "Caramelldansen," released on 2 November 2001. After the album was dropped, a standalone charity single "Allra Bästa Vänner" was released on 19 April 2002. The group disbanded shortly after.

2008 speedy mix
On May 1, 2008, Remixed Records released the sped-up version of the original Supergott album on Apple's iTunes Store. The album was called Supergott Speedy Mixes. 
In Japan, this was titled U-u-uma-uma SPEED with the song titles completely rewritten with emoticons. Speed reached number 48 on Oricon and stayed 5 weeks.

2016 reissue
On 3 December 2016, the album was reissued for digital download via Tunecore and YouTube Music.

On 10 March 2020, the album was removed from all digital retailers and streaming services but was put back on all digital retailers and streaming services on April 1, 2020.

Singles
"Vad Heter Du" was released on 29 June 2001 as the lead single from the album.

The song "Caramelldansen", which became an internet meme in subsequent years, was released on 2 November 2001 two weeks before the album's release.

"Ooa Hela Natten" was released as the third and final single from the album on 22 February 2002.

Track listing
 "Caramelldansen (Caramelldancing)" – 3:30
 "Vad Heter Du? (What's Your Name?)" – 3:15
 "Ooa Hela Natten (Singing All Night) [a cover of the Attack song of the same name]" – 3:40
 "Doktorn (Doctor)" – 3:11
 "I Min Mobil (In My Phone)" – 4:01
 "Spelar Ingen Roll (It Doesn't Matter)" – 3:36
 "Diskotek (Discotheque)" – 3:39
 "I Drömmarnas Land (In Dreamworld)" – 3:12
 "Kom Håll Om Mig (Come On Hold Me)" – 3:45
 "Här E Jag (Here I Am)"– 3:24
 "Ett & Två (One And Two)" – 3:25
 "Vild Och Galen (Wild And Crazy)" – 3:21
 "Caramell Megamix" – 4:43

See also
Caramelldansen

References

2001 albums
2002 albums
Caramell albums